NGC 6394 is a barred spiral galaxy located in the constellation Draco. It is designated as SBb in the galaxy morphological classification scheme and was discovered by the American astronomer Lewis A. Swift on 7 July 1885.

See also 
 List of NGC objects (6001–7000)
 List of NGC objects

References

External links 
 

Barred spiral galaxies
Draco (constellation)
6394